Kathy Shelton (born 1962) is an American sexual assault survivor. One of the defendants in her 1975 case was represented by  Hillary Clinton (then Rodham), which caused controversy when Clinton stood as the Democratic Party candidate in the 2016 US presidential election.

Early life
Shelton was raised by a single mother in Springdale, Arkansas.

1975 attack and trial
In 1975, at age 12, Shelton was brutally raped by two men in Arkansas.

One of the men accused of raping Shelton was 
41-year-old defendant Thomas Alfred Taylor whose court-appointed criminal defense lawyer was 27-year-old Hillary Clinton in her first-time appearance as courtroom litigator. In her autobiography, Clinton said she was reluctant to take the case and asked to be let off the case; her account was later confirmed by the prosecutor in the case. At the time, she was working at the legal aid clinic at the University of Arkansas and represented the defendant for free.

Taylor pleaded guilty to unlawful fondling of a minor under the age of 14. Based on court documents obtained by CNN and Clinton's account in her 2003 memoir Living History, Clinton won a plea deal for Taylor, securing a significantly reduced charge and sentence, based on the prosecution's loss of critical pieces of evidence.

Audio recordings
Mid-1980s taped interviews with Clinton by Roy Reed, a reporter for Esquire, were released in 2014 after being found in the archives of the University of Arkansas at Fayetteville. Reed said "She was laughing at the vagaries of the legal system that play out every day across America in one way or another." At one point, she laughed in the interview while recounting that Taylor passed a polygraph test, which she said "forever destroyed my faith in polygraphs."

Reception
After Shelton became aware that Clinton had been the criminal defense lawyer of the defendant in her case decades earlier, Shelton stated in 2007 that she herself bore no ill will toward Clinton for having had to act as her assailant's court-appointed criminal defence lawyer in the rape case, saying "I have to understand that she was representing Taylor ... Hillary was just doing her job." Later in 2016, Shelton claimed that she had been misquoted in the 2007 interview. She told the Daily Beast in 2014, "Hillary Clinton took me through hell." Shelton said, "I started seeing where I had really been stomped in the ground. I didn't really know what to do about it. I just figured life would have to go on and I would have to live with it". She also said it was after hearing Clinton discussing the case in previously unpublished tapes that she decided to speak out publicly.

During the 2016 presidential campaign, Shelton was interviewed by The Daily Mail, a British tabloid, and set up a GoFundMe page to raise $10,000. On the page, she stated that Clinton had forced her to "undergo multiple polygraph tests" and "was sent for a psychiatric examination". However, according to The Washington Post fact-checker, there is no evidence that Clinton played a role in Shelton taking a polygraph test. Shelton did not undergo psychiatric examination: "one day after Clinton filed a request for psychiatric exam, it was denied by the judge." After The Washington Post published its fact-check of Shelton's claims, the GoFundMe site removed the text about polygraph tests and psychiatric examinations.

During the campaign, Shelton spoke out against Clinton in a surprise press conference held by Donald Trump before the second presidential debate between him and Hillary Clinton. Also attending the conference were Juanita Broaddrick, Paula Jones and Kathleen Willey.

References

External links 

1962 births
1975 crimes in the United States
American victims of crime
Hillary Clinton controversies
Living people
People from Springdale, Arkansas
Rapes in the United States